Lucille Newmark (1880-1965) was an American screenwriter active during the 1920s and 1930s. Little is known about her personal life, but she wrote intertitles during the silent era and scripts and dialogue after that.

Selected filmography 

 Miss Pacific Fleet (1935)
 Let Us Be Gay (1930)
 Not So Dumb (1930) 
 Untamed (1929)
 Sioux Blood (1929)
 A Single Man (1929)
 Their Own Desire (1929) (uncredited)
 The Cardboard Lover (1928)
 Tea for Three (1927)

References

External links

American women screenwriters
1880 births
1965 deaths
People from New York (state)
20th-century American women writers
20th-century American screenwriters